Hindustan Ke Hunarbaaz is a talent show for children airing on Life OK which premiered on 22 October 2012 and went off air on 16 November 2012.

References

External links
 Official site

2012 Indian television series debuts
Life OK original programming
2012 Indian television series endings
Indian reality television series